Osjollo Anante (possibly from Quechua usqullu Andean mountain cat,) is a mountain in the Vilcanota mountain range in the Andes of Peru near a lake of the same name. It is located in the Cusco Region, Canchis Province, Pitumarca District, and in the Quispicanchi Province, Ocongate District. Osjollo Anante lies southwest of the mountains Jatunñaño Punta and Chumpe, west of Uriyuq, northwest of Cuncapata and northwest of the lake Sibinacocha and northeast of Japu Japu.

References

Mountains of Cusco Region
Glaciers of Peru
Lakes of Cusco Region
Mountains of Peru
Landforms of Cusco Region
Lakes of Peru